Stronghold is a live album by the English rock band Magnum, released in 1997 by SPV. It is the UK re-release of The Last Dance, which originally was only distributed in Europe. This edition included bonus tracks.

Sanctuary Records released a remastered and expanded edition in 2007, along with Magnum's first six albums. The deluxe packaging has new sleeve notes and an exclusive interview with Tony Clarkin.

Track listing

Cover sleeve
The cover art was designed by Rodney Matthews.

Personnel
Tony Clarkin — guitar
Bob Catley — vocals
Wally Lowe — bass guitar
Mark Stanway — keyboards
Mickey Barker — drums

References

External links
 www.magnumonline.co.uk — Official Magnum site

Magnum (band) live albums
1996 live albums
SPV/Steamhammer live albums
Albums with cover art by Rodney Matthews